Burwick is a small peninsula north of Scalloway in the Shetland Islands, Scotland.

References

External links

Landforms of Shetland
Peninsulas of Scotland
Mainland, Shetland